The 1990–91 National Division One (known as the Courage League for sponsorship reasons) was the fourth season of top flight rugby union in England. 

The league was expanded to thirteen teams, with promoted teams Northampton Saints and Liverpool St Helens replacing Bedford Blues. Each team played each other once. 

Bath were the champions, beating Wasps by just one point. Moseley and Liverpool St Helens were relegated.

Participating teams

Table

Results
The home team is listed in the left column.

Sponsorship
National Division One is part of the Courage Clubs Championship and is sponsored by Courage Brewery.

References

External links
 Official website

Premiership Rugby seasons
 
English